Abu Hlaifa City Stadium is a multi-use stadium in Abu Hulayfah, Kuwait. It is currently used mostly for football matches and is the home stadium of Sahel. The stadium holds 2,000 people.

External links
Stadium information

Football venues in Kuwait